Cheekface is an American indie rock band based in Los Angeles, California. Formed in 2017, the group consists of Greg Katz, Amanda Tannen, and Mark Edwards. Cheekface has released three studio albums, two EPs, and one live album, all on Katz's own label, New Professor Music. The group's songs, characterized by Katz's talk-singing, are lyrics-driven with a dry sense of humor and tend to share a thematic interest in anxiety and sociopolitical unease. Some of Cheekface's fans refer to themselves as Cheek Freaks.

History
Cheekface consists of three members: Greg Katz (guitar), Amanda Tannen (bass), and Mark Edwards (drums). After graduating from the University of California, Los Angeles, during the Great Recession, Katz began to working in artists and repertoire for record labels. Katz, who played bass in the band LA Font, lost his job in 2011 and thereafter began his own label, New Professor Music. Tannen, meanwhile, had trained in classical cello in her youth and had played bass with the Brooklyn, New York-based indie rock band Stellastarr in the 2000s. After the band's dissolution, Tannen worked in graphic design and moved to Los Angeles. She was connected with Katz through a graphic design friend who was dating him around 2017, and the pair decided to begin writing songs together.

Cheekface formed in Los Angeles in 2017 with the recruitment of Edwards, whom Katz was familiar with Edwards from the city's music scene. Tannen stated that she wanted to "be in a band that is not cool"; the group considered other names before Cheekface including Ryan Gosling's Huge Freakin' Delts and Plumping. Cheekface's first year was dedicated to songwriting; Tannen and Katz described the writing process as attempts to make one another laugh, with lyrics that successfully accomplished this ending up in the songs.

Katz and Tannen wrote what would become the group's breakout single, "Dry Heat/Nice Town" (2018), after attending the 2017 Women's March. The band began to play live in 2018, generally as an opening act. While not expecting an enthusiastic response to their music, in 2019 while playing a set at The Satellite in Los Angeles, Katz was startled when a small group of attendees sang along to every word in one of the band's tracks, temporarily causing him to forget his own lyrics for several lines. The band released their first album, Therapy Island, in March 2019.

Amidst the early months of the COVID-19 pandemic in 2020, Cheekface contributed a cover of "That Thing You Do!" to the tribute album Saving for a Custom Van, honoring the track's songwriter, Adam Schlesinger, who died of COVID-19 complications earlier in the year. In January 2021, the band released its second album, Emphatically No., and later in the year they released an EP of B-sides from that record, titled Emphatically Mo'''. Emphatically No was listed as one of Pastes 40 best rock albums of 2021. In August 2022 the band released their third album, Too Much to Ask, after announcing it only to fans via postcards sent the month before. Three months later, they released a second EP of B-sides entitled Don't Ask and in December the band put out an unannounced live album, Live at Baby's All Right, recorded at Brooklyn's Baby's All Right the preceding October.

Cheekface fashions itself as "America's Local Band" in reference to obscure music projects that are locally beloved but do not reach listeners outside of their music scenes. The band's music is released on Katz's New Professor Music label, with album artwork by Tannen. Cheekface's fans call themselves Cheek Freaks, analogous to Deadheads, fans of the Grateful Dead.

Musical style and influences
Cheekface is an indie rock band. Zach Schonfeld in Alternative Press'' described their music as lyrics-driven with a dry sense of humor and characterized the group's songs as consisting heavily of one-liners, obscure name-drops, and references to bygone cultural moments. Schonfeld wrote about anxiety and sociopolitical dread being recurring themes in Cheekface's music. The band asks sound technicians at venues they play for "no reverb, no delay, [and] lyrics should be clear". The focus on lyrics over melody conveys a "jittery emotional landscape" that Katz has compared to someone speaking too quickly because they are anxious about something.

Cheekface described themselves as being influenced by "great American talk-singers" including Lou Reed, Stephen Malkmus, and Jonathan Richman, as well as by the alternative hip hop group Das Racist. In a 2022 review, Chris Deville compared Katz's singing style to that of Reed and Malkmus, as well as to James Murphy of the band LCD Soundsystem, Travis Morrison of The Dismemberment Plan, Jeff Rosenstock, The B-52's, and Devo.

Discography

References

External links
 

2017 establishments in California
Musical groups established in 2017
Indie rock musical groups from California
American musical trios
Musical groups from Los Angeles